Bruno Tommasi (14 January 1930 – 17 September 2015) was an Italian Roman Catholic bishop.

He was born in Montignoso and ordained a priest in 1958. Tommasi was named the bishop of Pontremoli in June 1983 and simultaneously served as coadjutor bishop of Apuania until July 1983. Pontremoli was combined with Massa Carrara in 1988, and was led by Tommasi through 1991, when he was appointed the archbishop of Lucca. He retired in 2005.

References

1930 births
2015 deaths
20th-century Italian Roman Catholic archbishops
People from the Province of Massa-Carrara
21st-century Italian Roman Catholic archbishops
Bishops of Lucca